Kolima is a large lake in central Finland. It is an open lake with few islands and some ranges of rocks. Almost half of the lake is protected under the Natura 2000 program because of the lake's good natural and hydrological condition. A typical fish in the lake is the venance. The lake is suitable for canoeing and maps are available for water tourists. One route starts from Pihtipudas and goes southward to the Kärnänkoski rapids.

References

Kymi basin
Landforms of Central Finland
Kolima
Kolima